Carlos Reyes may refer to:
 Carlos Humberto Reyes, Honduran trade union leader and political candidate
 Carlos Reyes (baseball) (born 1969), United States Major League Baseball player
 Carlos Reyes (Uruguayan footballer) (1957–2009), Uruguayan footballer and manager
 Carlos Reyes (Chilean footballer) (born 1973), former Chilean footballer
 Carlos Reyes-Manzo (born 1944), documentary photographer, photojournalist and poet from Chile
 Carlos Reyes (boxer), Puerto Rican boxer at the 1984 Summer Olympics
 Cotton Hill, a character from the King of the Hill animated series, translated as "Carlos Reyes" for Hispanic America